Chicken Street ( Koch-e Murgha) is a narrow street located in the Shahr-e Naw district of Kabul east of the Asamayi. It has been an iconic shopping street in the city and popular with foreigners, famous for its carpets, handicrafts and antiques.

History

Chicken Street was the major attraction for foreigners during the Hippie trail from the 1960s to late 1970s. Afghan coats, bracelets and plenty of hashish made it popular. Hippies would also smoke opium here. Along with hotels, it provided items for the travelers to use en route towards Kathmandu. The street and tourism in general declined with the start of the Soviet–Afghan War.

Following the United States invasion of Afghanistan and the influx of  foreign diplomats and other visitors, the street was thriving again for it became a popular place for Afghan souvenirs. Traditional Afghan rugs and lapis lazuli stones were popular with shoppers. Emerald, rubies, exotic food and artists selling paintings are among the other attractions on offer. However the departure of most foreign NATO troops by 2014 led to a significant downturn in business. Security issues have also hampered business.

Despite its name, the street is not known for its sale of chickens - those are instead sold on the adjacent Flower Street.

In popular culture
Chicken Street was the subject of the eponymous 2005 novel by Amanda Sthers.

The street is featured in the 2007 documentary film 16 Days in Afghanistan.

See also
 Freak Street

References

Streets in Kabul
Hippie movement